Harveys Lake or Harvey's Lake or Harvey Lake may refer to

Harveys Lake, Pennsylvania (borough in Luzerne County)
Harveys Lake (Pennsylvania) (lake)
Harvey's Lake (Vermont)